Elizabeth Craft and Sarah Fain are American television screenwriters and producers, mostly working together as partners. They have also written two young adult fiction novels together.

Craft and Fain are from Kansas City, Missouri, and wrote their first piece together when they were 15 years old for their high school newspaper. Both Craft and Fain attended The Pembroke Hill School. Craft graduated from Columbia College in 1993. She is married to producer Adam Fierro and is the sister of writer Gretchen Rubin. Fain graduated from Williams College in 1993.

Works

The Fix 
Craft and Fain were executive producers, creators and writers on the limited television series The Fix. On this project they partnered with Marcia Clark, who was a co-executive producer. The Fix aired its ten episodes on ABC.

Angel 
Craft and Fain joined Mutant Enemy Productions in 2002, during the fourth season of Joss Whedon's Angel. They penned eight episodes of seasons 4 and 5 and served as the show's executive story editors during its fifth season.

The Shield 
After Angel went off air in 2004, Craft and Fain joined the staff of The Shield as co-producers of the show's fourth season. They eventually became producers of the fifth, and supervising producers of the sixth season, also writing several episodes during this time.

Women's Murder Club 
In 2007, Craft and Fain created Women's Murder Club, a police procedural drama produced by 20th Century Fox Television and airing on ABC. The show premiered on October 12, 2007, and Craft and Fain also served as its executive producers. After producing the first ten episodes, the show went on hiatus due to the 2007–2008 Writers Guild of America strike, and Craft and Fain were subsequently fired from the project. They were therefore not involved in the final three episodes of Women's Murder Club.

Dollhouse 
In 2008, Craft and Fain returned to working with Joss Whedon on his new series Dollhouse as showrunners. The show, produced by 20th Century Fox Television, got a thirteen-episode commitment by Fox and began airing there in February 2009, running for two seasons.

Lie to Me 
When the cancellation of Dollhouse was announced, Fox moved Craft and Fain to the writing staff of the new TV series Lie to Me, which surprised Joss Whedon fans. Craft and Fain were under contract to Fox, not Whedon, and they explained that it was a decision by their employers in which they had little say.

Secret Circle 
Craft and Fain in 2010 developed a series with Kevin Williamson for The CW based upon The Secret Circle book trilogy by L. J. Smith. Screenwriter Andrew Miller penned the pilot. Secret Circle follows a 16-year-old girl named Cassie, who moves to New Salem and enrolls in a high school there but she soon discovers that she and the other students are witches.

Fantasy Island 
Craft and Fain rebooted Fantasy Island for Fox in 2021.

Novels 
The duo have written two novels, Bass Ackwards and Belly Up and its sequel Footfree and Fancyloose. The books follow nine months in the life of four teenage best friends, Harper, Becca, Kate, and Sophie.

Happier in Hollywood podcast 
On her weekly podcast Happier with Gretchen Rubin, Craft discusses good habits and happiness with her New York-based sister, Gretchen Rubin.

Elizabeth and Sarah started their own spinoff of the podcast, titled "Happier in Hollywood," in May 2017.

References

External links 

Elizabeth Craft and Sarah Fain on Myspace
Elizabeth Craft and Sarah Fain answer our questions..... Interview with fans of Dollhouse at dollhousetvforum.com

21st-century American novelists
21st-century American women writers
American television producers
American women television producers
American television writers
American women novelists
Living people
Screenwriting duos
Showrunners
American women television writers
Place of birth missing (living people)
Year of birth missing (living people)
Williams College alumni
21st-century American screenwriters
Columbia College (New York) alumni